Scapanopygus cinereus is a species of beetle in the family Cerambycidae, the only species in the genus Scapanopygus. Both the genus and species were described in 1913 by French entomologist Pierre-Émile Gounelle. The type specimen was collected from Averías, a municipality in Argentina, on the banks of the Salado River.

In 2005, Monné and Napp transferred the genera Ranqueles and Scapanopygus to the tribe Bothriospilini based on cladistic analysis.

References

Bothriospilini
Beetle genera
Beetles described in 1913
Monotypic Cerambycidae genera